Hugo Orlando Gatti (born 19 August 1944) is an Argentine former professional football goalkeeper who played in the Argentine Primera División for 26 seasons and set a record of 765 league and 52 international appearances, totaling 817 games played. Gatti is the player with most appearances in the Argentine league ever.

During his career, Gatti won three Primera División titles, two Copa Libertadores tournaments, and one Intercontinental Cup, all with Boca Juniors, and played professionally until the age of 44.

Gatti, nicknamed El Loco (The Madman) was recognized for his charisma, his innovative playing style for his position and his eccentricity. He developed himself into a goalkeeper who relied on positional play rather than on his reflexes. He would frequently leave the penalty area to function as an additional field player, and join his teammates in defense – and many times in attack. Unlike most goalkeepers of his era, he made extensive use of his feet, head, and chest to control or strike the ball. He was one of the pioneers of the achique, the goalkeeping technique of running out to challenge an oncoming opposing player. He was also notable at facing penalty kicks, saving 26 of them throughout his career, tied for the most ever in Primera División with contemporary goalkeeper Ubaldo Fillol.

Gatti was voted Player of the Year of Argentina in 1982, and was ranked as the third best Argentine goalkeeper of the 20th Century in a poll by the IFFHS.

Biography

Early life and career
Born in Carlos Tejedor, Province of Buenos Aires, Gatti was the youngest of siblings. During his youth he was adept at playing as a striker, which according to him was the best way of knowing how forwards tend to think and behave.

Club career
In 1960, at the age of 16, he attended a C.A. River Plate match and saw Amadeo Carrizo play, who would become one of his role models as a goalkeeper. He then started playing for Atlanta in the Argentine sixth division. His Primera División debut came in 1962 against Gimnasia y Esgrima La Plata.

Gatti played 38 matches for Atlanta, and after that he was acquired by River Plate. He played 77 matches for River between 1964 and 1968, alternating as the first choice goalkeeper with Amadeo Carrizo, until he was transferred to Gimnasia y Esgrima, for which he appeared in 244 league matches between 1969 and 1974. In 1975, he joined Unión de Santa Fe, which put on an impressive season with coach Juan Carlos Lorenzo.

Boca Juniors
Although Gatti was already famous prior to his arrival to Boca Juniors, it was in that club where he became legendary, and it is Boca Juniors the club he is historically most associated with. Gatti played a total 381 league matches and 47 Copa Libertadores matches for the Xeneizes from 1976 until his retirement in 1988. He is the goalkeeper with the most appearances in Boca Juniors history and the second overall player behind Roberto Mouzo, who played in 396 league matches.

His debut with Boca occurred on 15 February 1976. In 1976, he won the double of the Metropolitano and the Copa Libertadores. In the Copa Libertadores final, he saved a crucial penalty kick by Cruzeiro player Vanderlei. The following year, Boca won the Copa Libertadores again, and then beat Borussia Mönchengladbach in the final of the Intercontinental Cup. He won his third Metropolitano in 1981.

The 1980s were a difficult time for Boca, and Gatti had periods of inactivity during those years. His last match was on 11 September 1988, a day in which an error by him cost him and Boca the result. He was made a reserve after that, and he would never play an official match again.

On 24 January 1984, a friendly match between Boca Juniors and Gimnasia y Esgrima was played as a tribute to him.

International career
With the Argentina national team, Gatti won 18 caps. between 1967 and 1977. His international debut was on 13 August 1967 against Paraguay. He was part of the 1966 World Cup squad, but did not play as the first choice keeper was Antonio Roma. Argentina did not qualify for the 1970, and for the 1974 tournament, he was not selected to the squad. He was a starter during many friendlies prior to the 1978 World Cup under coach Cesar Menotti, but Gatti was left out of the Cup squad in favour of Ubaldo Fillol, Héctor Baley and Ricardo La Volpe.

His last international match was on 5 June 1977.

Post-retirement
Gatti has continued to be involved in football since his retirement as a player, writing columns and opinions that have been controversial at times. As of 2010, he lives in Spain and collaborates with several media outlets, notably "Punto Pelota" now "El Chiringuito de Jugones". Additionally, as of 2012, he collaborates with several football shows in Argentina.

Rivalry
For his Boca Juniors career, he was the counterpart of Ubaldo Fillol, another great Argentine goalkeeper who played in the nemesis team, River Plate. Fillol was always the image of professionalism and seriousness; "Madman" Gatti, on the other hand, looked eccentric and unorthodox.

Honours

Club
Boca Juniors
 Argentine Primera División: 1976 Metropolitano,  1976 Nacional, 1981 Metropolitano,
 Copa Libertadores: 1977, 1978
 Intercontinental Cup: 1977

Individual
Argentine Footballer of the Year: 1982

Records
 Argentine Primera División most appearances: 765

References and notes

External links

Hugo Orlando Gatti's biography – informexeneize.com 
"Hugo Orlando Gatti: El achique de Dios" – mediapunta.es 
 
 

1944 births
Living people
Sportspeople from Buenos Aires Province
Argentine people of Italian descent
Argentine footballers
Association football goalkeepers
Club Atlético Atlanta footballers
Club de Gimnasia y Esgrima La Plata footballers
Unión de Santa Fe footballers
Club Atlético River Plate footballers
Boca Juniors footballers
Copa Libertadores-winning players
1966 FIFA World Cup players
1975 Copa América players
Argentina international footballers
Argentine Primera División players